Erkan Sulejmani (born 13 July 1981 in Pristina) is a retired Kosovan footballer.

Club career
His first club was FK Pristina. Erkan also played for several Turkish teams where, during five years, played a total of 92 First League matches and scored 24 goals. Next, in January 2005 he signed a six months contract with FK Željezničar Sarajevo in Bosnia and Herzegovina before he moved to KS Vllaznia Shkodër in June 2005. He is a midfielder and plays in the centre. On 2006, Erkan was voted as the best player of the Albanian Superliga. He last played as a midfielder for Kastrioti Krujë in Albania.

Honours
Albanian Superliga Best player: 2006

References

External links
 
 Profile - FSHF

1981 births
Living people
Sportspeople from Pristina
Kosovo Albanians
Association football midfielders
Kosovan footballers
FC Prishtina players
İstanbulspor footballers
Bursaspor footballers
Gençlerbirliği S.K. footballers
Trabzonspor footballers
FK Željezničar Sarajevo players
KF Vllaznia Shkodër players
KS Kastrioti players
Süper Lig players
Kategoria Superiore players
Kosovan expatriate footballers
Expatriate footballers in Turkey
Kosovan expatriate sportspeople in Turkey
Expatriate footballers in Bosnia and Herzegovina
Kosovan expatriate sportspeople in Bosnia and Herzegovina
Expatriate footballers in Albania
Kosovan expatriate sportspeople in Albania